Ponca Jazz Records is a jazz record label founded by Hilde Hefte in Kristiansand, Norway in 2004

Background 
Hefte had an idea of releasing the Rolf Søder recording Jargong Vålereng'  with Egil Kapstad as composer, arranger and band leader. This idea evolved and eventually she started the label Ponca Jazz, and Jargong Vålereng' was released as an album in 2004. There after many artists showed interest, and a series of albums was released in 2005.

Then Jon Larsen offered Ponca Jazz Records to take over parts of Hot Club Records' catalog. This was interesting, and lead to a faster growth, and allowed Ponca Jazz Records to become one of the major jazz labels in Norway. Several key jazz musicians and singers are now in Ponca Jazz Records catalog.

Discography 
Albums (in selection)

References

External links 

Jazz record labels
Norwegian record labels
Record labels established in 2004
Culture in Agder